The following are the Special Awards given by the Metro Manila Film Festival.

Special awards

15th Metro Manila Film Festival
Posthumous award: Vic Silayan
Special award: D'Wonder Film's Pagputok ng Arawm Babaha ng Dugo sa Irosin

16th Metro Manila Film Festival
Best Dressed Actor: Ricky Belmonte
Best Dressed Actress: Star Querubin

17th Metro Manila Film Festival
Special Recognition Award: Victoriano Ramos Villanueva (a.k.a. "Torbillano)
Posthumous award: Carmen Rosales
Robert "Bobby" Talavis
Leroy Salvador Jr.
Lamberto Avellana

18th Metro Manila Film Festival
Special Recognition Award: Joseph Estrada
Joey Lina
Gawad ng Natatanging Pagkilala: Nora Aunor
Female Star of the Night: Tetchie Agbayani
Male Star of the Night: Bernard Bonnin

22nd Metro Manila Film Festival
Star of the Night: Melanie Marquez
Plaque of Recognition for Winning in the Cairo Film Festival: Nora Aunor

29th Metro Manila Film Festival
People's Choice for Best Picture: Mano Po 2: My Home
People's Choice for Best Actor: Richard Gomez - Filipinas
People's Choice for Best Actress: Sharon Cuneta - Crying Ladies

33rd Metro Manila Film Festival
People's Choice for Best Picture: Shake, Rattle & Roll 9
People's Choice for Best Director: Paul Daza - Shake, Rattle & Roll 9
People's Choice for Best Float: Shake, Rattle & Roll 9
Resiklo (1st runner-up)
Sakal, Sakali, Saklolo (2nd runner-up)

35th Metro Manila Film Festival
Lifetime Achievement Award: Dolphy
Posthumous Award for Film Service and Excellence: Esperidion Laxa

37th Metro Manila Film Festival
Lifetime Achievement Award: Eddie Garcia
Posthumous Award for Film Service and Excellence: Lito Calzado
Kutis Ganda Award - Male - Ryan Agoncillo
Kutis Ganda Award - Female - Ai Ai delas Alas
Male Sexiest Appeal Celebrity of the Night - ER Ejercito
Female Sexiest Appeal Celebrity of the Night - Judy Ann Santos
Ellen Lising Male Face of the Night - Richard Gomez
Ellen Lising Female Face of the Night - Iza Calzado

40th Metro Manila Film Festival
Youth Choice Award: Bonifacio: Ang Unang Pangulo
Commemorative Award for Vision and Leadership: Joseph Estrada
Special MMFF 40th Year Award: Francis Tolentino
Special Recognition Award (posthumous): Guillermo de Vega; accepted by wife Maria de Vega
Face of the Night: Nadine Lustre

References
IMDB: Metro Manila Film Festival

External links
Official website of the Metro Manila Film Festival

Special Awards